Heather B. Swann (born 1961) is an Australian contemporary artist known for her expressive surrealist sculptural objects, often combined with installation, performance and drawings. Her work draws on artisanal traditions, carving, modelling and tailoring materials to stretch, twist and manipulate her creaturely forms that are at once whimsical and darkly ambiguous. She has received numerous recognition for her work, and her pieces are held in prominent collections including the National Gallery of Australia, Dubbo Regional Gallery and the Ian Potter Museum of Art.
" My work is a way of holding on to the world. My sculptures and drawings are figurative and modernist in expression, with curved forms, an insistent use of black and a marked surrealist accent."

Recognition, scholarship and awards 

 Paul Guest Drawing Prize (2014)
 Goddard Sapin-Jaloustre Scholarship, France (2005)
 Rosamund McCulloch Scholarship, University of Tasmania, Cite Internationale des Arts, Paris, France (1998)

Exhibitions 

 Leda and the Swan, Tarrawarra Museum of Art, Victoria (2021-2022)
 Know my name: Australian women artists 1900 to now, National Gallery of Australia, Canberra (2021 - 2022) 
 I LET MY BODY FALL INTO A RHYTHM, BuOY Arts Centre, Tokyo, Japan and The Ian Potter Museum of Art, Melbourne, Australia (2017-2018)
 Nervous, National Gallery of Australia, Canberra (2017)
 Banksia Men, 2016 Adelaide Biennial of Australian Art: Magic Object, Art Gallery of South Australia, Adelaide (2016) Paul Guest Drawing Prize, Bendigo Art Gallery, Bendigo (2014)
 Solitaire, TarraWarra Museum of Art, Victoria (2014)
 Creep Show, Strange Neighbour, Melbourne (2013)
 I am Heathcliff, Daine Singer Gallery, Melbourne (2012)
 Louise Bourgeois and Australian Artists, Heide Museum of Modern Art, Melbourne (2012)
 Seven Things To Do In An Emergency, The British School at Rome, Rome (2011)
 Marcher sur les pelouses, Plimsoll Gallery, Hobart (2009)
 Who let the dogs out, Lake Macquarie City Art Gallery (2008)
 Swan Hill Prints and Drawing Acquisitive Awards, Swan Hill Regional Art Gallery (2008)
 A Room Inside, Ian Potter Museum of Art, the University of Melbourne (2007
 Woollahra Small Sculpture Prize, Woollahra, Sydney (2007 & 2006)
 Stan and Maureen Duke Gold Coast Art Prize, Gold Coast City Art Gallery (2007)
 Helen Lempriere National Sculpture Award, Werribee Park, Victoria (2002 - 2005)
 National works on paper prize, Mornington Peninsula Regional Gallery (2004) 
 National Sculpture Prize and Exhibition, National Gallery of Australia, Canberra (2001)

References 

1961 births
Living people
21st-century Australian artists
Australian surrealist artists
20th-century Australian sculptors